Douglas B. Rasmussen (born 1948) is professor of philosophy at St. John's University, where he has taught since 1981.

Biography
Rasmussen earned his B.A. (1971) from the University of Iowa, and his Ph.D. (1980) in Philosophy from Marquette University. Rasmussen's areas of scholarly interest include Political Philosophy, Ethics, Ontology, Epistemology, Business Ethics, and Political Economy.

Rasmussen has contributed articles to leading journals such as American Philosophical Quarterly, International Philosophical Quarterly, The New Scholasticism, Public Affairs Quarterly, The Review of Metaphysics, American Catholic Philosophical Quarterly, Social Philosophy and Policy, and The Thomist.

Rasmussen coauthored (with Douglas Den Uyl) several books: Liberty and Nature: An Aristotelian Defense of Liberal Order (1991); Liberalism Defended: The Challenge of Post-Modernity (1997); and Norms of Liberty: A Perfectionist Basis for Non-Perfectionist Politics (2005). He also co-edited (with Den Uyl) The Philosophic Thought of Ayn Rand (1984).

A collection of scholarly essays about Rasmussen and Den Uyl's Norms of Liberty, Reading Rasmussen and Den Uyl: Critical Essays on "Norms of Liberty", edited by Aeon J. Skoble, was published in 2008.

References

External links
 Douglas B. Rasmussen's faculty page at St. John's University
 Rasmussen's CATO page
 Interview with Professor Douglas Rasmussen at the Center for Ethics and Entrepreneurship

American philosophers
1948 births
Living people